Whites Brook is an unincorporated community in Restigouche County, New Brunswick, Canada.

The local service district of White's Brook takes its name from the community but adds an apostrophe to the name.

History

Notable people

See also
List of communities in New Brunswick

References

Communities in Restigouche County, New Brunswick
Local service districts of Restigouche County, New Brunswick